Beverley Bie Brahic is a Canadian poet and translator who lives in Paris, France and the San Francisco Bay Area. Her poetry collection, White Sheets, was a finalist for the Forward Prize  and a Poetry Book Society Recommendation. Her translations include Guillaume Apollinaire:The Little Auto, winner of the Scott Moncrieff Prize; Francis Ponge: Unfinished Ode to Mud, a finalist for the Popescu Prize for Poetry in Translation; Yves Bonnefoy: The Present Hour; and books by Hélène Cixous, including Portrait of Jacques Derrida as a Young Jewish Saint, Manhattan, and Hyperdream, Jacques Derrida and Julia Kristeva.

Poetry 
Catch and Release. (Wigtown, 2020). Winner of the Wigtown Book Festival Alastair Reid 2020 Pamphlet Prize.
Baudelaire: Invitation to the Voyage, Selected Poems, translated by Beverley Bie Brahic (Seagull Books, 2019)]
The Hotel Eden. (Carcanet, 2018).
Hunting the Boar. (CBeditions). Poetry Book Society Recommendation, 2016.
White Sheets. (CBeditions). 2012 Forward Prize Best Collection finalist; Poetry Book Society Recommendation.
White Sheets. (Fitzhenry & Whiteside, 2012).
Against Gravity. (Worple Press, 2005)
Unfinished Ode to Mud by Francis Ponge. (CBeditions). 2009 Popescu Prize for Poetry Translation  finalist.
The Little Auto by Guillaume Apollinaire. (CBeditions, 2012). Winner of the Scott Moncrieff Prize.  Northern California Book Awards finalist.
The Present Hour by Yves Bonnefoy (Seagull Books, 2013)
The Anchor's Long Chain by Yves Bonnefoy (Seagull Books)

Selected prose translations 
Rue Traversière by Yves Bonnefoy .
Jacques Derrida. Geneses, Genealogies, Genre and Genius (Columbia and Edinburgh University Presses, 2006).
Julia Kristeva. This Incredible Need to Believe (Columbia University Press, 2009). 2010 French American Foundation Translation Award finalist.
Hélène Cixous. Portrait of Jacques Derrida as a Young Jewish Saint (Columbia University Press, 2004).
—. Reveries of the Wild Woman (Northwestern University Press, 2006).
—. The Day I Wasn't There (Northwestern University Press, 2006).
—. Dream I Tell You (Columbia and Edinburgh University Presses, 2006).
— and Roni Horn. Agua Viva (Rings of Lispector) (Steidl Verlag, 2006)
--. —. Manhattan  (Fordham University Press, 2007).
—. Hyperdream (Polity Press, 2009). Nominated for the Impac Dublin Prize 2011.
—. Hemlock (Polity Press, 2011).
— and Frédéric-Yves Jeannet. Encounters: Conversations on Life and Writing (Polity Press, 2012).
—. Twists and Turns in the Heart's Antarctic (Polity Press, 2014). 2014 PEN Translation Prize longlist.

Other 
 the eye goes after (limited edition artist's book of twenty digital images by Susan Cantrick accompanying twenty poems by Beverley Bie Brahic, Paris, 2007)
"Fractals" was set to music for violin and narration by Marcel Dortort, and inaugurated at The Rumanian Cultural Centre in Paris in 2008 as "If."

References

21st-century Canadian poets
Canadian women poets
Living people
Year of birth missing (living people)
21st-century Canadian women writers
21st-century Canadian translators
Canadian women non-fiction writers